Palestine is represented on the International Olympic Committee by the Palestine Olympic Committee, which has sent teams to compete at each Summer Olympics since 1996 under the IOC country code PLE. Palestine has yet to compete at the Winter Olympics, and no athletes from Palestine have ever won an Olympic medal.

Palestine has been recognized as a member of the Olympic Council of Asia (OCA) since 1986, and the International Olympic Committee (IOC) since 1995.

Medal tables

Medals by Summer Games

See also
 List of flag bearers for Palestine at the Olympics
 Palestine at the Paralympics

References

External links